Loughmore–Castleiney GAA is a Gaelic Athletic Association club in County Tipperary, Ireland. The club competes in the Mid-Tipperary division of Tipperary GAA, and draws its players and support from the parish of the same name. The area comprises the villages of Loughmore and Castleiney with their surrounding hinterland.

History
Loughmore–Castleiney has traditionally been a Gaelic football club but also has a successful hurling team, making it one of the very few dual clubs at senior level in County Tipperary.

Early Years (1884-1940)
Although Loughmore–Castleiney GAA club didn’t really become an entity until the forties, Gaelic games flourished in the parish since the founding of Cumann Luthchleas Gael in 1884. Because of the parish’s proximity to Thurles, it is hardly surprising that clubs in Loughmore and Castleiney were among the first nine clubs formed in Mid Tipperary in 1885, one year after the Association’s founding. Teams from both Loughmore and Castleiney were among the seven Mid Tipperary teams involved in the first football county championship in 1887. In the Senior football county final of 1895, Loughmore were defeated by Arravale Rovers.

Surprisingly there was no senior football team in the parish again until 1909 when Castleiney were one of three teams to contest the first Mid Football championship, which was won by Thurles. During the next decade teams from both Castleiney and Loughmore fielded in the Senior football championship every year. Castleiney won the 1914 Mid and county Senior football finals. In the same year, they won the first Junior football championship organised by the Mid Tipperary Board. Castleiney–Templetouhy United also won Mid titles in 1915 and 1919. Loughmore were united with Templemore during the second half of this decade.

The club provided Jim Ryan and Bill Ryan to the Tipperary GAA team that played in Croke Park on Bloody Sunday against Dublin GAA in November 1920 when their playing colleague Michael Hogan of Grangemockler was one of 15 people shot and killed by British forces who opened fire from the sidelines.

Apart from Ballyduag, in the first decade of the 20th century, very little competitive hurling appears to have been played in the parish until Castleiney contested the Mid Junior final of 1923. They succeeded in winning the Mid Junior final of 1925. Three years later in 1928 Castleiney–Killea became Mid Senior hurling champions. Denis Mackey played on the Tipperary Junior hurling team that won the Munster final in 1929.

Castleiney won the Mid Junior football final of 1938 but lost the county final to Emly. Promotion to senior ranks in 1939 resulted in a heavy defeat from Templemore Eire Og. Loughmore won the Mid Junior final of 1939 but suffered a similar fate to Castleiney when they lost to Ballingarry in the County final. United for the first time in 1940, Loughmore–Castleiney made parish history by winning the Mid and county senior football titles.

Separation and Reunification (1941-1969)
Although Castleiney and Loughmore amalgamated on a couple of occasions in the thirties they appear to have been only temporary arrangements. The forties was a much more successful period for the now united Castleiney-Loughmore team. The 1940 success was followed in 1946 with county Senior football honours and five divisional senior football titles were also won.

Castleiney and Loughmore went their separate ways during the fifties. Loughmore contested six consecutive county Senior football finals winning in 1955. In 1959 the parish had two senior football teams for the first time since 1887 as a result of Castleiney’s Junior success in 1958. Loughmore came out on top when they met in the Mid final of 1959 and the Mid semi-final of 1960.

At the 1961 Mid convention a rule was passed that only allowed one hurling and football club in a rural parish. Loughmore and Castleiney have been united since. The reunification did not bring the instant success enjoyed twenty-one years earlier in 1940. It was 1965 before the first Mid Senior football title was won and not until 1973 was the next Senior football county title brought back to the parish.

Becoming a Dual Club (1970-1999)
The seventies proved very successful for the club with three Senior football county titles and three U-21 football county titles won. Two county minor doubles in 1976 and 1979 were also achieved. The earlier minor/u-21 successes of the fifties and sixties had been diluted somewhat by amalgamation with neighbours Moyne–Templetuohy. Juvenile titles both divisional and county were won for the first time. Having a successful juvenile club since 1970 has been the foundation for the many successes enjoyed at senior level. Sean Kearney and Eddie Webster won Railway Cup football medals with Munster in 1974 and 1975. Eddie’s son, Micheál, became the club’s third Railway Cup medal winner thirty years later, this time in hurling.

The eighties were to prove even more successful; winning the 1980 Intermediate hurling county final gave the club dual senior status which has not been relinquished since. Two Senior football titles, 1983 and 1987, and one Senior hurling, 1988, were won. On two occasions, 1983 and 1987, the elusive double was within a score of being achieved. In 1989, Pat McGrath and John Cormack added Senior All-Ireland hurling medals to their already considerable under-age collection at national level. Peter Brennan and Jim Maher were also All-Ireland hurling medal winners at minor and U-21. Maher in fact captaining the successful Tipperary 1980 minor side.

In the nineties, a Senior football title in 1992 was the highlight. Ned Ryan brought distinction to the club and parish when he won a Senior hurling All-Ireland medal in 1991.

Inter-County Success (2000-2012)
The new millennium started well with David Kennedy, Paul Ormond and Noel Morris collecting All-Ireland Senior hurling medals in 2001. It was Ormond's second Celtic Cross as he already had a Junior football All-Ireland. The noughties brought two Senior county titles to the parish also; football in 2004 and hurling in 2007. Club history was made in 2007 when the Munster Club hurling championship was won, before losing to Portumna in the All-Ireland Senior Club Hurling Championship semi-final.

Liam McGrath captained the successful All-Ireland minor football team of 2011. John Meagher, John McGrath and Darragh Butler also brought All-Ireland medals to the parish on that great occasion. In 2012, it was Eddie Connolly’s turn to bring an All-Ireland cup to the parish – Intermediate hurling on this occasion when Evan Sweeney also collected a medal.

County Doubles (2013-present)
In 2013, Loughmore–Castleiney became the first team to win both the football and hurling Tipperary Senior titles in the same year. Back to back county football titles was another first when the club retained the Senior football county final in 2014. The McGrath brothers brought great honour to the club in 2016 when Noel and John won Senior hurling All-Ireland medals and Brian captained the successful minor team on the first Sunday of September. It was Noel’s second senior medal and both he and John had enjoyed under-age hurling success with Tipperary already. They have also been recognised for All-Star awards.

The Senior football county title was regained in 2016 after defeating Moyle Rovers in the final. In 2017, following a lapse of 39 years, a Junior A football county final was achieved and the Intermediate footballers won a Mid title. In 2018, the Senior footballers won their fourth Mid title in a row with the Senior hurlers also attaining a Mid title. In 2020, a fantastic run of success ended by reaching both county finals, agonisingly losing both finals to Clonmel Commercials in the football by a single point and losing the hurling by two points to Kiladangan.

In 2021, the first piece of silverware came from our Junior C hurlers who won the Mid final beating Gortnahoe–Glengoole on a score line of 1-14 to 0-08. Senior football and hurling championship was played every weekend with hurling one week and football the next. On the 16th successive week, the Senior footballers took the county tile with a one-point win over Clonmel Commercials. Week 17, the county Senior hurling final replay saw a 2-14 to 2-13 victory over Thurles Sarsfields which secured a second county double for Loughmore Castleiney.

Honours

Gaelic Football

Senior
Tipperary Senior Football Championship (15)
(Castleiney) 1914
1940, 1946, 1955, 1973, 1977, 1979, 1983, 1987, 1992, 2004, 2013, 2014, 2016, 2021
Mid-Tipperary Senior Football Championship (61)
(Castleiney) 1914, 1915, 1919
1940, 1941, 1946, 1947, 1948, 1951
(Loughmore) 1954, 1955, 1956, 1957, 1958
1965, 1966, 1967, 1968, 1969, 1970, 1971, 1972, 1973, 1974, 1975, 1976, 1977, 1978, 1979, 1980, 1981, 1982, 1983, 1984, 1985, 1987, 1988, 1989, 1990, 1991, 1992, 1993, 1994, 1995, 1996, 1997, 1998, 1999, 2000, 2003, 2004, 2005, 2007, 2008, 2009, 2010, 2012, 2015, 2016, 2017, 2018

Intermediate
Mid Tipperary Intermediate Football Championship (3)
1978, 1987, 2018

Junior
Tipperary Junior A Football Championship (2)
1978, 2017
Mid Tipperary Junior A Football Championship (22)
(Castleiney) 1914, 1938, 1955, 1958, 1959
(Loughmore) 1934, 1939, 1960, 1961
1947, 1948, 1949, 1950, 1953, 1962, 1978, 1993, 2003, 2005, 2006, 2011, 2014
Mid Tipperary Junior B Football Championship (2)
1994, 1997

Under-21
Tipperary Under-21 A Football Championship (10)
1964, 1970, 1974, 1976, 1979, 1997, 2004, 2005, 2006, 2012
Mid Tipperary Under-21 A Football Championship (28)
1963, 1964, 1965, 1966, 1969, 1970, 1972, 1974, 1976, 1977, 1978, 1979, 1980, 1981, 1990, 1994, 1995, 1996, 1997, 2004, 2005, 2006, 2009, 2010, 2011, 2012, 2013, 2015
Mid Tipperary Under-21 B Football Championship (2)
1988, 1993

Minor
Tipperary Minor A Football Championship (6)
(Castleiney) 1956
1964, 1976, 1977, 1979, 2002
Mid Tipperary Minor A Football Championship (21)
(Castleiney) 1955, 1956, 1957
1959, 1964, 1965, 1966, 1972, 1974, 1975, 1976, 1977, 1978, 1979, 1980, 2001, 2002, 2008, 2009, 2010, 2011
Mid Tipperary Minor B Football Championship (6)
1985, 1989, 1992, 1999, 2006, 2015

Hurling

Senior
Munster Senior Club Hurling Championship (1)
2007
Tipperary Senior Hurling Championship (4)
1988, 2007, 2013, 2021
Mid Tipperary Senior Hurling Championship (14)
(Killea-Castleiney) 1928
1983, 1986, 1987, 1988, 1992, 1994, 1998, 2002, 2003, 2004, 2011, 2016, 2018

Intermediate
Tipperary Intermediate Hurling Championship (1)
1980
Mid Tipperary Intermediate Hurling Championship (1)
1980

Junior
Mid Tipperary Junior A Hurling Championship (3)
 (Castleiney) 1925
1940, 2011
Mid Tipperary Junior B Hurling Championship (1)
1993
Mid Tipperary Junior C Hurling Championship (2)
2021, 2022

Under-21
Tipperary Under-21 A Hurling Championship (2)
2011, 2014
Mid Tipperary Under-21 A Hurling Championship (6)
1979, 1981, 1982, 2004, 2011, 2014
Tipperary Under-21 B Hurling Championship (1) 
1994
Mid Tipperary Under-21 B Hurling Championship (3)
1988, 1994, 1998

Minor
Tipperary Minor A Hurling Championship (4)
1976, 1979, 2002, 2009
Mid Tipperary Minor A Hurling Championship (8)
1974, 1976, 1977, 1978, 1979, 2002, 2009, 2011
Tipperary Minor B Hurling Championship (1)
1993
Mid Tipperary Minor B Hurling Championship (4)
1993, 1999, 2014, 2015

Ladies' Football
The club had a very successful Ladies' football team in the seventies but folded. The club revived its Ladies' football team in 2022. Women from the parish who wish to play camogie tend to play with neighbouring club Drom & Inch.

Honours

Senior
Munster Senior Club Ladies' Football Championship (1)
1977

Tipperary Senior Ladies' Football Championship (5)
1975, 1976, 1977, 1978, 1979

Junior
Tipperary Junior B Ladies' Football Championship (1)
2022

Notable Players
 Eddie Connolly
 John Cormack
 Jim Healy
 David Kennedy
 Brian McGrath
 John McGrath
 Liam McGrath
 Noel McGrath
 Pat McGrath
 Tom McGrath
 John Meagher
 Noel Morris
 Elias O'Keeffe
 Paul Ormond
 Micheál Webster

References

External links
Loughmore–Castleiney club website
Tipperary GAA site
Tipperary GAA archives
"Dual ambitions: Loughmore–Castleiney and Ballyboden St Enda's dreaming big", The Irish Times, 2020

Gaelic games clubs in County Tipperary
Hurling clubs in County Tipperary
Gaelic football clubs in County Tipperary